Cosnett is a surname. Notable people with the surname include:

Elizabeth Joan Cosnett (born 1936), British hymnodist
John Cosnett (1951–2018), British darts player 
Rick Cosnett (born 1983), Zimbabwean-Australian actor

See also
Consett